Hamrštějn is a castle ruin located close to the city of Liberec, Czech Republic.

See also
List of castles in the Liberec Region

Castles in the Czech Republic
Populated places in Liberec District
Castles in the Liberec Region